This is a list of museums in Curaçao. There are 30 recognised museums in Curaçao

 Blue Bay Sculpture Garden — Blue Bay is a sculpture park and open-air museum located in Boca Samí.
 Children's Museum — The Children's Museum is for young children where they can learn by playing. The museum has a hands-on policy.
 Curaçao Museum — The Curaçaosch Museum contains a large collection of paintings, furniture, glass, and textile.
 Fort Church Museum — The Fort Church Museum is dedicated to the history of the Protestant community and is located inside Fort Amsterdam.
 Jewish Historical Cultural Museum — The Jewish Historical Cultural Museum is dedicated to the history of the Jews in Curaçao and is attached to the Mikvé Israel-Emanuel Synagogue.
  — Kas di Pal'i Maishi is an open air museum about the living conditions of the slaves in Barber.
 Kurá Hulanda Museum — The Kurá Hulanda Museum is an anthropological museum which specialises in the Atlantic slave trade.
 Landhuis Bloemhof — Landhuis Bloemhof is an art gallery and museum dedicated to the memory of the sculptress May Henriquez.
  — The Maritime Museum offers an overview of the maritime history of Curaçao.
 Octagon Museum — The Octagon Museum is housed in the octagon cupola where Simón Bolívar was exiled before he liberated Venezuela from Spanish rule.
 Savonet Museum — The Savonet Museum is located in the plantation house near the entrance to Christoffelpark, and recounts the history of the plantation and its owners and slaves.
 Tula Museum — The Tula Museum is dedicated to the Curaçao Slave Revolt of 1795 and located in the Knip Plantation in Lagún.

See also 
 List of museums by country

References

External links 

 Museums of Curaçao

Curaçao
 
Curaçao
Curaçao-related lists
Curaçao
Lists of organisations based in Curaçao